Osinovo is a rural locality (a village) in Klyapovskoye Rural Settlement, Beryozovsky District, Perm Krai, Russia. The population was 20 as of 2010. There are 2 streets.

Geography 
Osinovo is located on the Taz River, 9 km southeast of  Beryozovka (the district's administrative centre) by road. Borodino is the nearest rural locality.

References 

Rural localities in Beryozovsky District, Perm Krai